This is a list of all video game lists on Wikipedia, sorted by varying classifications.

By platform

Acorn
 List of Acorn Electron games

Apple
 List of Apple II games
 List of Apple IIGS games
 List of iOS games
 List of Macintosh games

Amstrad
 List of Amstrad CPC games
 List of Amstrad PCW games

Atari
 List of Atari 2600 games
 List of Atari 5200 games
 List of Atari 7800 games
 List of Atari Jaguar games
 List of Atari Jaguar CD games
 List of Atari Lynx games
 List of Atari ST games
 List of Atari XEGS games

Bandai
 List of Bandai RX-78 games
 List of Bandai Super Vision 8000 games
 List of Design Master Senshi Mangajukuu games
 List of Playdia games
 List of Pippin games
 List of Terebikko games
 List of WonderSwan games
 List of WonderSwan Color games

Casio
 List of Casio Loopy games
 List of Casio PV-1000 games

Commodore
 List of Commodore PET games
 List of Amiga games
 List of Amiga CD32 games
 List of Commodore 64 games
 List of VIC-20 games

Fujitsu
 List of FM Towns games

Google
 List of Android games
 List of Stadia games

Leapfrog
 List of ClickStart games
 List of Leapfrog Didj games
 List of Leapfrog Leapster games
 List of Leapfrog Leapster Explorer games

Linux
 List of Linux games

Mattel
 List of Aquarius games
 List of Hyperscan games
 List of Intellivision games
 List of Pixter games

Microsoft

DOS and Windows
 Index of DOS games
 List of Windows 3.x games
 Index of Windows games
 List of Games for Windows titles
 List of Games for Windows – Live titles
 List of Windows Games on Demand
 List of Xbox Live games on Windows 8.x
 List of Xbox Live games on Windows 10
 List of Xbox Live games on Windows Phone

MSX
 List of MSX games

Xbox

 List of Xbox games
 List of Xbox System Link games
 List of Xbox 360 games
 List of Xbox 360 games (A–L)
 List of Xbox 360 games (M–Z)
 List of Xbox 360 System Link games
 List of Xbox games compatible with Xbox 360
 List of Xbox One games
 List of Xbox One games (A–L)
 List of Xbox One games (M–Z)
 List of backward-compatible games for Xbox One
 List of Xbox One X enhanced games
 List of Xbox Series X games

NEC
 List of PC-FX games
 List of TurboGrafx-16 games

Nintendo

Nintendo home consoles
 List of Famicom games
 List of Famicom Disk System games
 List of Nintendo Entertainment System games
 List of Super Nintendo Entertainment System games
 List of Satellaview broadcasts
 List of Virtual Boy games
 List of Nintendo 64 games
 List of GameCube games
 List of Wii games
 List of WiiWare games
 List of Virtual Console games for Wii (Japan)
 List of Virtual Console games for Wii (North America)
 List of Virtual Console games for Wii (PAL region)
 List of Virtual Console games for Wii (South Korea)
 List of Wii U games
 List of Wii games on Wii U eShop
 List of Virtual Console games for Wii U (Japan)
 List of Virtual Console games for Wii U (North America)
 List of Virtual Console games for Wii U (PAL region)
 List of Nintendo Switch games

Nintendo handheld consoles
 List of Game & Watch games
 List of Game Boy games
 List of multiplayer Game Boy games
 List of Game Boy Color games
 List of Super Game Boy games
 List of Game Boy Advance games
 List of Nintendo DS games
 List of DSiWare games and applications
 List of Nintendo 3DS games
 List of Virtual Console games for Nintendo 3DS (Japan)
 List of Virtual Console games for Nintendo 3DS (North America)
 List of Virtual Console games for Nintendo 3DS (PAL region)
 List of Virtual Console games for Nintendo 3DS (South Korea)
 List of Virtual Console games for Nintendo 3DS (Taiwan and Hong Kong)
 List of Pokémon Mini games

Phillips
 List of CD-i games
 List of Magnavox Odyssey² games

Sega
 List of SG-1000 games
 List of Master System games
 List of TecToy Master System 131 games
 List of Sega Genesis games
 List of 32X games
 List of Sega CD games
 List of Game Gear games
 List of Sega Pico games
 List of Advanced Pico Beena games
 List of Sega Saturn games
 List of Dreamcast games

Sinclair
 List of ZX Spectrum games

SNK
 List of Neo Geo games
 List of Neo Geo Pocket Color games

Sony

 List of PlayStation games
 List of PlayStation games (A–L)
 List of PlayStation games (M–Z)
 Lists of PS one Classics
 List of PlayStation 2 games
 List of PlayStation 2 games (A–K)
 List of PlayStation 2 games (L–Z)
 List of PlayStation 3 games
 List of PlayStation 3 games (A–C)
 List of PlayStation 3 games (D–I)
 List of PlayStation 3 games (J–P)
 List of PlayStation 3 games (Q–Z)
 List of PlayStation 2 Classics for PlayStation 3
 List of PlayStation 4 games
 List of PlayStation 4 games (A–L)
 List of PlayStation 4 games (M–Z)
 List of PlayStation 4 free-to-play games
 List of PlayStation 2 games for PlayStation 4
 List of PlayStation VR games
 List of PlayStation 5 games
 List of PlayStation Portable games
 List of downloadable PlayStation Portable games
 List of PlayStation minis
 List of PlayStation Vita games
 List of PlayStation Vita games (A–D)
 List of PlayStation Vita games (E–H)
 List of PlayStation Vita games (I–L)
 List of PlayStation Vita games (M–O)
 List of PlayStation Vita games (P–R)
 List of PlayStation Vita games (S)
 List of PlayStation Vita games (T–V)
 List of PlayStation Vita games (W–Z)
 Lists of PlayStation Store games
 List of PlayStation Store TurboGrafx-16 games
 List of Sony Pictures mobile games

Tandy
 List of TRS-80 games

VTech
 List of VTech CreatiVision games
 List of VTech Socrates games
 List of VTech V.Flash games
 List of VTech V.Smile games

Other platforms
 List of 3DO games
 List of Action Max games
 List of APF Imagination Machine games
 List of arcade video games
 List of Arcadia 2001 games
 List of Bally Astrocade games
 List of BBC Bridge Companion games
 List of browser games
 List of Cassette Vision games
 List of ColecoVision games
 List of Coleco Adam games 
 List of Creatronic Mega Duck games
 List of Entex Select-A-Game games
 List of Epoch Game Pocket Computer games
 List of Fairchild Channel F games
 List of Gakken Compact Vision TV Boy games
 List of Gamate games
 List of Game Master games
 List of Game.com games
 List of Gizmondo games
 List of GP2X games
 List of commercial GP32 games
 List of HP3000 games
 List of Interton VC 4000 games
 List of Kaypro games
 List of Memorex VIS games
 List of Mindset games
 List of N-Gage games
 List of Nichibutsu My Vision games
 List of Nuon games
 List of Ouya games
 List of Palladium Tele-Cassetten Game games
 List of PC games
 List of free PC games
 List of PC Booter games
 List of Pioneer LaserActive games
 List of RCA Studio II games
 List of SAM Coupé games
 List of SHG Black Point games
 List of Super A'Can games
 List of Super Cassette Vision games
 List of Takara Video Challenger games
 List of View-Master Interactive Vision games
 List of Tapwave Zodiac games
 List of Tomy Tutor games
 List of Vectrex games
 List of Watara Supervision games
 List of XavixPORT games
 List of Zapit Game Wave games
 List of Zeebo games

By developer

By publisher

 List of Activision video games
 List of Atari, Inc. games
 List of Atari, Inc. (Atari, SA subsidiary) games
 List of Atlus games
 List of Blizzard Entertainment games
 List of Capcom games
 List of Cygames games
 List of Disney Interactive Studios games
 List of Electronic Arts games
 List of King games
 List of Koei games
 List of Kojima Productions games
 List of Konami games
 List of Namco games
 Lists of Nintendo games
 List of Nintendo products
 List of video games published by Rockstar Games
 List of Sega games
 List of SNK games
 List of Sony Interactive Entertainment video games
 List of Ubisoft games
 List of Xbox Game Studios video games

By hardware

 List of accessories to video games by system
 List of dedicated video game consoles
 List of handheld game consoles
 List of home video game consoles
 List of microconsoles
 List of retro style video game consoles

By date 

 List of video games in development

By character or franchise

 List of longest-running video game franchises
 List of .hack media
 List of Beatmania video games
 List of Bleach video games
 List of Bomberman video games
 List of Castlevania media
 List of Dance Dance Revolution video games
 List of Digimon video games
 List of Disney video games
 List of Eamon adventures
 List of F-Zero media
 List of Final Fantasy video games
 List of Final Fantasy media
 List of Guitar Freaks and Drum Mania video games
 List of Kirby media
 List of The Legend of Zelda media
 List of Mega Man video games
 List of Metroid media
 List of Mortal Kombat media
 List of Nancy Drew video games
 List of Naruto video games
 List of Pokémon video games
 List of Resident Evil media
 List of The Simpsons video games
 List of Sonic the Hedgehog video games
 List of Star Wars video games
 List of StarCraft media
 List of Story of Seasons video games
 List of Transformers video games
 List of Xenosaga characters
 List of video games featuring Miis
 List of WWE video games
 List of WWE 2K Games video games

Mario
 List of Donkey Kong video games
 List of Luigi video games
 List of Mario educational games
 List of Mario puzzle games
 List of Mario racing games
 List of Mario role-playing games
 List of Mario sports games
 List of Wario video games
 List of Yoshi video games
 List of video games featuring Mario

By feature
 List of augmented reality video games
 List of computer games with spawn versions
 List of gacha games
 List of geolocation-based video games
 List of stereoscopic video games
 List of video games that support cross-platform play

By region

Development 
List of video games developed in Argentina
List of video games developed in Armenia
List of video games developed in Australia
List of video games developed in Austria
List of video games developed in Bangladesh
List of video games developed in Belarus
List of video games developed in Belgium
List of video games developed in Brazil
List of video games developed in Bulgaria
List of video games developed in Cameroon
List of video games developed in Canada
List of video games developed in Chile
List of video games developed in China
List of video games developed in Colombia
List of video games developed in Costa Rica
List of video games developed in Croatia
List of video games developed in Cyprus
 List of video games developed in the Czech Republic
List of video games developed in Denmark
List of video games developed in Egypt
List of video games developed in Estonia
List of video games developed in Finland
 List of video games developed in France
 List of video games developed in Germany
List of video games developed in Greece
List of video games developed in Hungary
List of video games developed in Iceland
 List of video games developed in India
List of video games developed in Indonesia
List of video games developed in Iran
List of video games developed in Ireland
List of video games developed in Israel
List of video games developed in Italy
 List of video games developed in Japan
 List of video games developed in the Netherlands
List of video games developed in Poland
 List of video games developed in Spain
 List of video games developed in Sweden
 List of video games developed in the United Kingdom
 List of video games developed in the United States

Set 

 List of video games set in Afghanistan
 List of video games set in Albania
 List of video games set in Algeria
 List of video games set in Angola
 List of video games set in Argentina
 List of video games set in Australia

By genre

Action
 List of beat 'em ups
 List of fighting games
 List of first-person shooters
 List of gun games
 List of platform game series
 List of third-person shooters

Casual and puzzle
 List of party video games
 List of puzzle video games
 List of maze video games
 List of Tetris variants
 List of quiz arcade games

Role-playing
 List of role-playing video games
 List of massively multiplayer online role-playing games
 List of MUDs
 List of roguelikes

Simulation
 List of business simulation video games
 List of city-building video games
 List of racing video games
 List of god video games
 List of simulation video games
 List of space flight simulation games

Sports

 List of American football video games
 List of association football video games
 List of Australian rules football video games
 List of baseball video games
 List of basketball video games
 List of Formula One video games
 List of golf video games
 List of ice hockey video games
 List of licensed professional wrestling video games
 List of NASCAR video games
 List of rugby union video games
 List of snowboarding video games
 List of sumo video games
 List of Olympic video games
 List of volleyball video games
 List of WWE video games

Strategy
 List of 4X video games
 List of artillery video games
 List of chess software
 List of grand strategy video games
 List of multiplayer online battle arena games
 List of real-time strategy video games
 List of real-time tactics video games
 List of turn-based strategy video games
 List of turn-based tactics video games
 List of tactical role-playing video games

Other
 List of card game-based video games
 List of Christian video games
 List of educational video games
 List of erotic video games
 List of eroge
 List of graphic adventure games
 List of horror video games
 List of music video games
 List of ninja video games
List of survival video games
 List of text-based computer games
 List of vampire video games
 List of Western video games
 List of World War I video games
 List of World War II video games
 List of zombie video games

By technology
 List of cel-shaded video games

By license
 List of freeware video games
 List of freeware first-person shooters
 List of open-source video games
 List of commercial video games released as freeware
 List of commercial video games with available source code
 List of crossovers in video games
 List of video games based on anime or manga
 List of video games based on cartoons
 List of video games based on comics
 List of video games based on DC Comics
 List of video games based on films

By player type 
 List of cooperative video games
 List of massively multiplayer online games
 List of free massively multiplayer online games
 List of massively multiplayer online first-person shooter games
 List of massively multiplayer online real-time strategy games
 List of massively multiplayer online turn-based strategy games
 List of free multiplayer online games
 List of multiplayer browser games

By reception
 List of banned video games
 List of best-selling game consoles
 List of best-selling video games
 List of best-selling PC games
 List of best-selling video game franchises
 List of highest-grossing arcade games
 List of highest-grossing mobile games
 List of commercial failures in video games
 List of controversial video games
 List of recalled video games
 List of video games considered the best
 List of video games notable for negative reception

Other
 List of most expensive video games to develop
 List of pinball manufacturers
 List of vaporware
 List of video game console emulators
 List of video game remakes and remastered ports
 List of video games derived from modifications
 List of video games in the Museum of Modern Art
 List of video games notable for speedrunning
 List of video games with LGBT characters

See also
 List of video game websites
 List of video gaming topics